Uzunqazmalar (also, Uzunkazmalar and Uzyunkazmalar) is a village and municipality in the Zaqatala Rayon of Azerbaijan.  It has a population of 413.

References 

Populated places in Zaqatala District